Five A Side Soccer is a video game developed and published by Konami for the arcade.

Gameplay 
Five A Side Soccer is an indoor soccer game as a tabletop arcade machine with an overhead view.

Reception 
Next Generation reviewed the arcade version of the game, rating it three stars out of five, and stated that "For what this is, Five a Side Soccer is a fun and playable game that'll make recreational arcade-going more enjoyable."

References 

1995 video games
Arcade video games
Arcade-only video games
Association football video games